One of the six Boy Scouts of America councils that serves the San Francisco Bay area, the Pacific Skyline Council was founded in 1940 as the Stanford Area Council (#031). In 1994, the Stanford Area Council merged with the San Mateo County Council (#020) to form the current council which serves youth in San Mateo County and northern Santa Clara county.

Organization

 Discovery District: northern/western San Mateo County, including Brisbane, Colma, Daly City, El Granada, Half Moon Bay, Millbrae, Moss Beach, Pacifica, San Bruno, and South San Francisco
 Redwood District: southern San Mateo County, including Atherton, Belmont, Burlingame, Foster City, Hillsborough, Menlo Park, Portola Valley, Redwood City, San Carlos, San Mateo, Woodside, and La Honda
 Stanford District: northern Santa Clara County, including Palo Alto, Los Altos, Los Altos Hills, and Mountain View

Camps

 Cutter Scout Reservation (located in the Santa Cruz Mountains) is a Scout camp set in a redwood grove north of Big Basin Redwoods National Park. The camp contains many activities including a pool, a lake (Lake Gamlen), and an operational C.O.P.E. course. Many council weekend events are held at the reservation including Camporees, Order of the Arrow ordeals, and fellowships. In August 2020, the CZU Lightning Complex Fire burned through the camp. Several bigger structures, including the Harkson Lodge, were lost in the blaze, but a number of smaller structures survived.
 Boulder Creek Scout Reservation is located in the Santa Cruz Mountains near Boulder Creek, California. The reservation is home to the council's National Youth Leadership Training program performed every summer.
 Camp Oljato is a camp for Boy Scouts located at Huntington Lake in Lakeshore, CA (Fresno County) that was previously a pair of Jewish resident camps known as Camp Kelowa for Boys and Camp Singing Trail for Girls. In 1942, the camp was converted to a Boy Scout camp. Camp Oljato is primarily accessible by pontoon boats; these boats run on a regular schedule during the Scout camping season running from mid June to mid August.

Order of the Arrow

Ohlone Lodge #63 serves as the Order of the Arrow lodge for the Pacific Skyline Council. It was formed on January 1, 1995, with the merger of the Pomponio and Stanford-Oljato lodges. The lodge is named in honor of the Ohlone tribes of Native Americans. The lodge's totem is the California Sea Otter.

See also
 Scouting in California

References

Foster City, California
Western Region (Boy Scouts of America)
1994 establishments in California
Boy Scout councils in California